The 1999–00 season was Olympiacos's 41st consecutive season in the Alpha Ethniki and their 74th year in existence. The club were played their 3rd consecutive season in the UEFA Champions League. In the beginning of the summertime Olympiacos named Italian Alberto Bigon coach.

Squad

Competitions

Alpha Ethniki

League standings

Results summary

Results by round

Results
Match dates not available

Olympiacos - AEK 3-0
Olympiacos - Apollon Smyrnis 2-0
Olympiacos - Aris 2-0
Olympiacos - Ethnikos Asteras 5-0
Olympiacos - Ionikos 2-0
Olympiacos - Iraklis 1-0
Olympiacos - Kalamata 4-1
Olympiacos - Kavala 5-0
Olympiacos - OFI Crete 2-0
Olympiacos - Panachaiki 5-1
Olympiacos - Panathinaikos 2-2
Olympiacos - Paniliakos 2-1
Olympiacos - Panionios 5-0
Olympiacos - PAOK 4-1
Olympiacos - Proodeftiki 4-0
Olympiacos - Trikala 3-1
Olympiacos - Skoda Xanthi 3-1

AEK - Olympiacos 0-2
Apollon Smyrnis - Olympiacos 0-1
Aris - Olympiacos 0-1
Ethnikos Asteras - Olympiacos 1-1
Ionikos - Olympiacos 1-2
Iraklis - Olympiacos 3-4
Kalamata - Olympiacos 0-1
Kavala - Olympiacos 0-5
OFI Crete - Olympiacos 2-1
Panachaiki - Olympiacos 0-2
Panathinaikos - Olympiacos 2-0
Paniliakos - Olympiacos 0-3
Panionios - Olympiacos 0-1
PAOK - Olympiacos 0-2
Proodeftiki - Olympiacos 0-3
Trikala - Olympiacos 0-2
Skoda Xanthi - Olympiacos 0-1

UEFA Champions League

Group stage

All times at CET

UEFA Cup

Third round

All times at CET

Top scorer
 Alexandros Alexandris: 15 goals

Team kit

|

|

|

References

External links 
 Official Website of Olympiacos Piraeus 

Olympiacos F.C. seasons
Olympiacos
Greek football championship-winning seasons